The 18 kilometre cross-country skiing event was part of the cross-country skiing at the 1948 Winter Olympics programme. It was the fifth appearance of the event. The competition was held on Saturday, 31 January 1948. Eighty-four cross-country skiers from 15 nations competed.

Medalists

Results

References

External links
Official Olympic Report
 

Men's 18 kilometre
Men's 18 kilometre cross-country skiing at the Winter Olympics